Balabagan, officially the Municipality of Balabagan (Maranao and Iranun: Inged a Balabagan), is a 4th class municipality in the province of Lanao del Sur, Philippines. According to the 2020 census, it has a population of 29,863 people.

History
Balabagan became a municipality during the Presidency of Ferdinand Marcos. The area of Balabagan was owned and donated by Sultan a Dimasangkay sa Macadar.

Geography

Barangays
Balabagan is politically subdivided into 27 barangays.

Climate

Demographics

Economy

References

External links

Balabagan Profile at the DTI Cities and Municipalities Competitive Index
[ Philippine Standard Geographic Code]
Philippine Census Information
Local Governance Performance Management System

Municipalities of Lanao del Sur
Establishments by Philippine presidential decree